Overseas is an American indie rock band, that includes David Bazan of Pedro The Lion, Headphones and Lo Tom; Will Johnson of Centro-matic and South San Gabriel; plus Bubba & Matt Kadane of Bedhead and The New Year.

Their debut album was officially announced on April 4, 2013, and was released on June 11, 2013. A second album is being finished with a possible 2019 release date according to the band's website.

Discography

Studio albums
 Overseas (June 11, 2013)
 "Ghost To Be" 
 "Redback Strike" 
 "Old Love" 
 "HELLP" 
 "Lights Are Gonna Fall" 
 "Here (Wish You Were)"
 "The Sound Of Giving Way" 
 "Down Below"
 "Came With The Frame" 
 "All Your Own"

Members
 David Bazan - bass, vocals
 Will Johnson - drums, guitar, vocals
 Bubba Kadane - guitar, bass
 Matt Kadane - guitar, bass, drums

References

External links
Official website

American indie rock groups